Sacha Houlié (born 8 October 1988) is a French lawyer and politician of La République En Marche! (LREM) who has been serving as a member of the French National Assembly since the 2017 elections, representing the department of Vienne.

Political career

Early beginnings
Having previously been active for the Socialist Party, Houlié joined LREM in 2015. Together with three friends, including Pierre Person, he founded "Jeunes avec Macron" (Young People for Macron) in June 2015.

Member of the National Assembly, 2017–present
In parliament, Houlié has been serving as member of the Committee on Legal Affairs since 2017. In this capacity, he was his parliamentary group's rapporteur on 2019 legislation to strengthen the powers of elected municipal officials, particularly in small municipalities. From 2017 until 2018, he was also one of the National Assembly's six vice-presidents, under the leadership of president François de Rugy. Within his parliamentary group, he is considered a close ally of President Emmanuel Macron. 

Following Pierre Person's resignation from the LREM leadership in September 2020, Houlié joined him and stepped down as well.

In 2022, Houlié was elected chair of the Committee on Legal Affairs.

Other activities
 École nationale d'administration (ENA), Member of the Board of Directors

Political positions
Houlié is considered an advocate of an open and "inclusive" secularism. In early 2018, he was one of several LREM member who joined an informal parliamentary working group on Islam set up by Florent Boudié in order to contribute to the government's bill aimed at better organising and supervising the financing of the Muslim faith in France.

In May 2018, Houlié co-sponsored an initiative in favour of legalizing assisted reproductive technology (ART) for all women (singles, heterosexual couples or lesbian couples). 

Amid efforts to contain the COVID-19 pandemic in France, Houlié opposed the government's proposal for a state-supported “StopCovid” contact-tracing app project, arguing it could amount to "undemocratic state surveillance." Also in 2020, he went against his parliamentary group's majority and abstained from an important vote on a much discussed security bill drafted by his colleagues Alice Thourot and Jean-Michel Fauvergue that helps, among other measures, curtail the filming of police forces.

Controversy
In mid-2019, French farmers vandalized Houlié's office in Poitiers, in an effort to protest against his support for the Comprehensive Economic and Trade Agreement (CETA) between Canada and the European Union. In April 2021, the inscription "Death to pigs" was found written on the building's facade. In August 2021, the office was set on fire.

See also
 2017 French legislative election

References

1988 births
Living people
Deputies of the 15th National Assembly of the French Fifth Republic
La République En Marche! politicians
People from Deux-Sèvres
Politicians from Nouvelle-Aquitaine
University of Poitiers alumni
Paris 2 Panthéon-Assas University alumni
21st-century French lawyers